

Number ones 
Key
 – Number-one single of the year

Statistics by decade

By artist 
The following artists achieved four or more number-one hits during the 1970s.

Artists by total number of weeks at number-one 
The following artists were featured in top of the chart for the highest total number of weeks during the 1970s.

Songs by total number of weeks at number one 
The following songs were featured in top of the chart for the highest total number of weeks during the 1970s.

See also
 List of UK Singles Chart number ones of the 1970s
 List of number-one hits (United States)
 1970s in music

References

United States Hot 100
 1970s